Yang Hyun-Jung (born 25 July 1977) is a former South Korean football player and football coach who currently coaches Timor-Leste U-16 team.

Football career
He started pro football career with Jeonbuk Hyundai Motors in 2000. Jeonbuk selected him as first order of 2000 draft and he awarded Rookie of the Year of 2000 season. In 2004, he joined Gwangju Sangmu for military duties. He mostly played for Icheon Sangmu that was reserve team of Gwangju Sangmu and played at the Korea National League. He was given hardship discharge because of cruciate ligament surgery. He played for Daegu FC for one year. He also played V-League side Cảng Sài Gòn and Korea National League side Suwon City. He quit his career because cruciate ligament injury.

International career
His international career started as part of the South Korea national under-20 football team in the 1997 FIFA World Youth Championship. After his U-20 tenure, Yang was given his national team debut in the 1998 King's Cup match against Egypt. His short national team career ended only one month. Yang's national team appearance is three caps.

Honours
Individual
 K-League Rookie of the Year Award : 2000

References

External links
FIFA Player Statistics

 

1977 births
Living people
South Korean footballers
South Korea international footballers
South Korean expatriate footballers
South Korean expatriate sportspeople in Vietnam
Expatriate footballers in Vietnam
K League 1 players
Korea National League players
Jeonbuk Hyundai Motors players
Gimcheon Sangmu FC players
Daegu FC players
Suwon FC players
Dankook University alumni
Association football midfielders